Mimicogryllus is a genus of crickets in the family Gryllidae and tribe Gryllini.  Species have been found in Indo-China and Borneo.

Species 
Mimicogryllus includes the following species:
Mimicogryllus hymenopteroides Gorochov, 1994 - type species (locality: Vietnam)
Mimicogryllus maculatus Chopard, 1927
Mimicogryllus splendens Tan, Gorochov & Wahab, 2019

References

External links
 

Ensifera genera
crickets
Orthoptera of Indo-China